The Gentleman Misbehaves is a 1946 American musical film.

Plot

References

External links
The Gentleman Misbehaves at TCMDB

1946 films
American musical films
1940s English-language films
Films directed by George Sherman
1946 musical films
American black-and-white films
1940s American films